Ellen Marie Pawlikowski (born 1956) is a retired four-star general of the United States Air Force. She last served as the commander of Air Force Materiel Command at Wright-Patterson Air Force Base from June 8, 2015, to the end of July 2018, managing some 80,000 people and $60 billion in Air Force programs annually.
Pawlikowski retired from the Air Force on September 1, 2018, after 40 years of service. She currently serves on the board of directors for Raytheon Technologies, one of the largest aerospace and defense companies in the world, and is a Judge Widney Professor at the University of Southern California's Viterbi School of Engineering.

Military career
Born in East Orange, New Jersey and raised in Bloomfield, New Jersey, Pawlikowski entered the United States Air Force in 1978 through the ROTC program at New Jersey Institute of Technology after graduating with a Bachelor of Science in chemical engineering. She then attended the University of California, Berkeley, where she received a Doctorate of Philosophy in chemical engineering in December 1981, entering active duty at McClellan AFB, California, in April 1982.

Pawlikowski served as Director of the Acquisition Management Office for the Assistant Secretary of Defense for Atomic Energy and as Deputy Assistant to the Secretary of Defense for Counterproliferation. Her leadership assignments have included Program Director of the Airborne Laser program, commander of the Military Satellite Communications Systems Wing, Deputy Director of the National Reconnaissance Office, commander of the Air Force Research Laboratory, and commander of the Space and Missile Systems Center.

On February 18, 2015, the President of the United States nominated Pawlikowski for promotion to general and as assignment as commander of the Air Force Materiel Command. Pawlikoski's promotion and assignment to AFMC were confirmed by the United States Senate on March 27, 2015. On June 8, Pawlikowski assumed command of Air Force Materiel Command from General Janet C. Wolfenbarger.

Post-military career
Following her retirement from the United States Air Force on 9 August 2018, Pawlikowski accepted a place on the Board of Directors of Raytheon in September. Pawlikowski was elected a member of the National Academy of Engineering in 2014 for leadership in the development of technologies for national security programs including spacecraft operations and the Airborne Laser. As of August 2019, she serves as a Judge Widney Professor at the University of Southern California Viterbi School of Engineering.

Major awards and decorations
Her major awards and decorations include:

Dates of promotion
Second Lieutenant – May 25, 1978
First Lieutenant – May 25, 1981
Captain – May 25, 1983
Major – March 1, 1988
Lieutenant Colonel – April 1, 1992
Colonel – October 1, 1996
Brigadier General – June 1, 2005
Major General – July 22, 2008
Lieutenant General – June 3, 2011
General – June 8, 2015

See also
 List of female United States military generals and flag officers

References

Living people
1956 births
National Reconnaissance Office personnel
American people of Polish descent
New Jersey Institute of Technology alumni
Dwight D. Eisenhower School for National Security and Resource Strategy alumni
Recipients of the Air Force Distinguished Service Medal
Recipients of the Defense Superior Service Medal
Recipients of the Legion of Merit
Female generals of the United States Air Force
21st-century American women